Catherine Rose Greves, also known as Katie Greves (born 2 September 1982, London), is an Olympic Games silver medallist British rower, triple Olympian and former European Champion.

Rowing career
Smaller than many of her competitors, Greves was known amongst peers for her outstanding technical proficiency and race-craft.  She represented Headington School Oxford Boat Club and then University of London Boat Club whilst studying, followed by Leander Club for the majority of her international career. She is a life member of Wallingford Rowing Club. Her sister, Caroline, rowed at bow for Osiris in the 2015 reserve Women's Boat Race, and in winning became the first woman in history to cross the finish line of The Championship Course on the Tideway.

Olympic Games
Having come fifth at both the 2008 Summer Olympics in Beijing and the 2012 Summer Olympics in London, she rowed at bow in the Team GB crew that won an historic silver medal in the women's eight at the 2016 Olympic Games in Rio de Janeiro. This was the first Olympic medal that Team GB had ever won in this category.

World Championships
She was part of the British squad that topped the medal table at the 2011 World Rowing Championships in Bled, where she won a bronze medal as part of the eight with Alison Knowles, Jo Cook, Jessica Eddie, Louisa Reeve, Natasha Page, Lindsey Maguire, Victoria Thornley and Caroline O'Connor.

Personal life
Greves is now an English teacher at St Edward's School, Oxford.  A year after retirement from the sport, she (along with Debbie Flood) rowed in the Qualifying Races for the Princess Grace Challenge Cup at Henley Royal Regatta with two 15-year-old students from Sir William Perkins's School to inspire the next generation of women rowers.

Two days later, Greves competed at the Cycling Time Trials National 50mile Time Trial Championships in Teesside, winning the bronze medal at her first major championships in the sport.

References

External links
 

1982 births
Living people
English female rowers
British female rowers
Rowers from Greater London
Rowers at the 2008 Summer Olympics
Rowers at the 2012 Summer Olympics
Rowers at the 2016 Summer Olympics
Olympic rowers of Great Britain
Members of Leander Club
Olympic silver medallists for Great Britain
Medalists at the 2016 Summer Olympics
Olympic medalists in rowing
World Rowing Championships medalists for Great Britain
European Rowing Championships medalists